Mansfield College Boat Club (MCBC) is a rowing club for members of Mansfield College, Oxford. It was founded in 1965 by a group of students led by Michael Mahony. It is run by the Boat Club committee. It is affiliated to Oxford University Rowing Clubs (OURCs).

The club shares a club room and boat storage space with St Hilda's College Boat Club at the Longbridges boathouse, which opened in 1997. On 4 July 2005 Longbridges boathouse was hit by an arson attack which destroyed most of the equipment owned by MCBC. However, the club was able to replace old equipment with newer boats and two new sets of blades.

Results
The club fields a Men's First VIII and a Women's First VIII in the annual inter-collegiate Torpids and Summer Eights bumps racing competitions.

The club usually fields a Men's Second VIII and a Women's Second VIII in both competitions. In Torpids 2017, the Women's Second VIII, nicknamed the "American Eagle" because of the high proportion of American visiting students, won blades for the first time in history. By Torpids 2019, the strength of the Women's Second VIII was such that they bumped into fixed divisions, meaning they do not have to qualify for Torpids in its next iteration. In 2016 the Men's Second VIII reached fixed divisions in Summer Eights for the first time, winning blades in the process.

While 2020 saw the cancellation of many rowing events due to flooding, high stream, and the COVID-19 pandemic, three Mansfield rowers were selected as part of the squads that would have raced on Boat Race day. Moreover, the selection of Martha Birtles for the OUWBC blue boat and Caspar Jopling for the OUBC blue boat was a first in that both university openweight blue boats featured Mansfield rowers in the same year.

Notable member
Donald MacDonald was President of Oxford University Boat Club in the mutiny year of 1987, the events of which received publicity in the book True Blue: The Oxford Boat Race Mutiny and the film True Blue.

References

External links
Eights Week Chart, 1980-2008 (use menus for other charts)
Mansfield College Boat Club Website

Sports clubs established in 1965
Rowing clubs of the University of Oxford
Boat Club
1965 establishments in England
Rowing clubs in Oxfordshire
Rowing clubs of the River Thames